Alexander Gillespie (1776–1859) was a Scottish surgeon. 

Alexander Gillespie may also refer to:

 Al Gillespie (Alexander M. Gillespie), professor of law in New Zealand
 Alexander Garfield Gillespie (1881–1956), American football player and brigadier general in the United States Army
 George Alexander Gillespie (1872–1956), merchant and political figure in Ontario
 Alexander Gillespie Raymond Jr., known as Alex Raymond, (1909–1956), American cartoonist best known for creating the Flash Gordon comic